Joseph O'Dwyer (born 1959) is an Irish former hurler.  At club level he played with Killenaule and was also a member of the Tipperary senior hurling team. He usually lined out as a centre-back.

Career

O'Dwyer first played juvenile and underage hurling with the Killenaule club before joining the club's senior team. He had some divisional success, winning consecutive South Tipperary Championship titles. O'Dwyer first appeared on the inter-county scene with the Tipperary minor team that won the All-Ireland Minor Championship in 1976. He progressed onto the Tipperary under-21 team and won back-to-back All-Ireland Under-21 Championship titles from three consecutive finals appearances between 1978 and 1980. O'Dwyer subsequently made a number of league and championship appearances with the Tipperary senior hurling team before lining out with the junior team.

Honours

Killenaule
South Tipperary Senior Hurling Championship: 1988, 1989

Tipperary
Munster Junior Hurling Championship: 1985
All-Ireland Under-21 Hurling Championship: 1979, 1980
Munster Under-21 Hurling Championship: 1978, 1979, 1980
All-Ireland Minor Hurling Championship: 1976
Munster Minor Hurling Championship: 1976

References

External link

 Joe O'Dwyer profile on Tipp GAA Archives website

1959 births
Living people
Killenaule hurlers
Tipperary inter-county hurlers